The Commander of the Republic of Fiji Military Forces is the highest-ranking military officer of in the Republic of Fiji Military Forces, who is responsible for maintaining the operational command of the military. The current commander is Major General Jone Kalouniwai.

List of commanders

British rule
During British rule, the Commanders were:

Independence

See also
Republic of Fiji Military Forces

Notes

References

Military of Fiji
Fiji
 
1971 establishments in Fiji